Joe Reed II (1936–1964) was a Quarter Horse racehorse from the early days of the American Quarter Horse Association (or AQHA) that became an influential sire with the breed.

Life

Joe Reed II was registered number 985 in the AQHA's stud book. He was registered as a chestnut stallion that foaled in 1936. His breeder was recorded as J. W. House of Cameron, Texas, and his owner when he was registered was Bert H. Wood of Tucson, Arizona. He was the son of Joe Reed P-3 and Nellene, a daughter of Fleeting Time (TB). He was over half Thoroughbred by breeding, as both his sire and his dam were by Thoroughbreds. On his dam's side he traced twice to Traveler. His paternal granddam, Della Moore, was a Louisiana bred mare.

Racing career

In 1942 Joe Reed beat the famous Clabber to be proclaimed Champion Quarter Running Stallion. He raced three times that meet, and won all three races. He had a foot injury and the last race he bled from the foot the whole race, but managed to win the race anyway. After his racing career was cut short by that injury, Joe went on to sire such outstanding horses as Leo P-1335, Little Sister W, Joak, Joe Queen, and Tonta Lad.

Death and honors 
Joe Reed II died in 1964 at Fort Bridger, Wyoming.

Joe Reed was inducted into the AQHA Hall of Fame in 1994.

Pedigree

Notes

References

 All Breed Pedigree Database Pedigree of Joe Reed II retrieved on June 22, 2007
 AQHA Hall of Fame accessed on September 1, 2017

Further reading

External links
 Joe Reed II at Quarter Horse Directory
 Joe Reed II at Foundation Horses
 Joe Reed II at Quarter Horse Legends

American Quarter Horse racehorses
American Quarter Horse sires
1936 racehorse births
1964 racehorse deaths
AQHA Hall of Fame (horses)